Why We Fight is the debut album by Seattle-based Gatsbys American Dream.

It is the only album including former drummer Dustin McGhye who remained for two tours after the CD release and was replaced by Waxwing drummer Rudy Gajadhar, and bassist Josh Berg who remained only to the end of the recording session, where he was replaced by current bassist Kirk Huffman.

Track listing
 "Fall of George Mallory"
 "Where Shadows Lie"
 "Castaway"
 "Golden Ticket"
 "Nobody Wins"
 "Nicarockya"
 "Beware, Beware"
 "Game Over"
 "The Child"
 "Why We Fight"

Personnel
Nic Newsham - vocals
Bobby Darling - guitar/vocals
Ryan Van Wieringen - guitar
Josh Berg - bass/vocals
Dustin McGhye - drums

References

2002 debut albums
Gatsbys American Dream albums
Albums produced by Aaron Sprinkle